Cornelis Johannes Kieviet (8 March 1858 – 12 August 1931) was a Dutch teacher and writer of children's literature. He was born in Hoofddorp and is best known for his stories about a boy named Dik Trom. A statue of Dik Trom sitting backwards on a donkey can be found in the main square in Hoofddorp.

External links 
 Books (in Dutch) @dbnl
 
 
 

1858 births
1931 deaths
Dutch children's writers
People from Haarlemmermeer